Asari-Toru is a Local Government Area in Rivers State, Nigeria.

General Information
Asari-Toru Local Government Area was created out of the old Degema Local Government Area on May 16, 1989, under the Hon. Eziwoke Wokoma. The inhabitants are of a common language which is the “Kalabari” speaking nationality, with ancestral origin and beliefs, Currently, the Local Government Chairman is Hon. Onengiyeofori George.

Asari-Toru is the “Seat” of the Ancestral Stool of the Kalabari Speaking Dynasty which cuts across Akuku-Toru and Degema Local Government Areas.

The Local Government Area upon creation presently encompasses Seventeen (17) Communities namely:

 Buguma,
 Abalama,
 Abiama,
 Angulama,
 Atuka,
 Ido,
 Ifoko,
 Illelema,
 Krakrama,
 Minama,
 Okpo,
 Omekweama,
 Omekwetariama,
 Oporoama,
 Sama,
 Agama,
 Tema.

Buguma City is the Headquarters of the Local Government Area and Seat of the King of Kalabari Kingdom: His Royal Majesty, King (Prof.) T.J.T Princewill, Abbi the XI, Amayanabo of Kalabari Kingdom.

These communities have been grouped into thirteen (13) electoral wards, ten (10) of these wards are within the capital, Buguma City; while the remaining are grouped into Isia Group I, Isia Group II and West Central Group.

The local government area has an estimated area of 113 km and a population of 308,800 by projection of March 21, 2016

The postal code of the area is 504101 .

References

Local Government Areas in Rivers State
1989 establishments in Nigeria
1980s establishments in Rivers State